Golik is a surname. Notable people with this surname include:

 Bogdan Golik (born 1963), Polish politician
 Gordan Golik (born 1985), Croatian football player
 Krešo Golik (1922–1996), Croatian director
 Mathew Golik (1948–2008), mayor of Wolf Point, Montana
 Matija Golik (born 1993), Croatian handball player